Arturo Martínez (21 January 1919 – 21 August 1992) was a Mexican film actor and director. He began his career by appearing in Juan Charrasqueado (1948) during the Golden age of Mexican cinema and went on to appear in around a hundred and eighty films during his career. He started directing films in 1961.

Selected filmography

Actor
 Juan Charrasqueado (1948)
 Laura's Sin (1949)
 Rough But Respectable (1949)
 The Woman of the Port (1949)
 A Tailored Gentleman (1954)
 The Hidden One (1956)
 The Black Scorpion (1957)
 Raffles (1958)
The Boxer (1958)
Northern Courier (1960)
 Chucho el Roto (1960)

References

Bibliography
 Wood, Andrew Grant. The Borderlands: An Encyclopedia of Culture and Politics on the U.S.-Mexico Divide. Greenwood Press, 2008.

External links

1919 births
1992 deaths
Mexican male film actors
Male actors from San Luis Potosí
20th-century Mexican male actors
People from San Luis Potosí City